Stereotypes is a Canadian fantasy short film, directed by Jean-Marc Vallée and released in 1991. The film centres on a woman who turns into a monster, and plunges her husband into a surreal alternate world, after he cheats on her.

The film was a Genie Award nominee for Best Live Action Short Drama at the 14th Genie Awards, and Vallée won the Bourse Claude-Jutra for Most Promising Filmmaker at the 1993 Rendez-vous du cinéma québécois.

References

External links
 

1991 films
1991 fantasy films
Canadian fantasy films
Canadian drama short films
1991 short films
Films directed by Jean-Marc Vallée
French-language Canadian films
1990s Canadian films